The 1909 South Armagh by-election was held on 5 November 1909.  The by-election was held due to the death of the incumbent Irish Parliamentary MP, William McKillop.  It was won by the Irish Parliamentary candidate Charles O'Neill.

References

1909 elections in Ireland
1909 elections in the United Kingdom
By-elections to the Parliament of the United Kingdom in County Armagh constituencies
20th century in County Armagh